China Pharmaceutical University station, is a station of Line 1 of the Nanjing Metro. The rail depot for the southern extension of Line 1 is located to the west of the station.

References

Railway stations in Jiangsu
Railway stations in China opened in 2010
Nanjing Metro stations
2010 establishments in China
Railway stations in China at university and college campuses